Luke Thompson may refer to:

Sir Luke Thompson (politician) (1867–1941), British coal merchant and Conservative politician
 Luke Thompson (rugby league) (born 1995), English rugby league player for St Helens RLFC
 Luke Thompson (rugby union) (born 1981), Japanese rugby union player
 Luke Thompson (actor) (born 1988), British actor
 Luke Thompson (Australian footballer) (born 1991), Australian rules footballer
 Luke Willis Thompson (born 1988), New Zealand artist